Penola is a town in the Australian state of South Australia located about  southeast of the state capital of Adelaide in the wine growing area known as the Coonawarra.

It is known as the central location in the life of Mary MacKillop (St. Mary of the Cross), the first Australian to gain Roman Catholic sainthood, in 2010. In 1866 McKillop and a Catholic priest, Julian Tenison-Woods, established a Catholic school in the town.

Penola was on the Mount Gambier to Wolseley railway line which opened in 1887, until its closure to freight on 12 April 1995, and then to Limestone Coast Railway tourist passengers on 1 July 2006.

History

The Aboriginal Australians living in the area when Europeans arrived were the Bindjali people, although this meaning has also been ascribed to Coonawarra by the same source. A different source reports that the Bindjali expression, pena oorla means "wooden house", which referred to the first pub in the district, the Royal Oak.

The first settlers were Scottish-born Alexander Cameron and his wife Margaret in January 1844 after obtaining an occupation licence. In April 1850, Cameron obtained 80 acres (0.3 km2) of freehold land (his station was on a pastoral lease) and established the private town of "Panoola", later known as Penola.

By 1850, he had built the Royal Oak Hotel and was doing much business supplying liquor to the many travellers passing through to the Victoria goldfields.

Penola Post Office opened around 1852.

Religious services in the town were first conducted in a converted shop, before St Joseph's (Catholic) Church was built in 1859. This was replaced on the same site by a new one designed by Adelaide architect Herbert Jory in Romanesque Revival style and opened in 1924.

John Riddoch purchased Yallum in 1861. Riddoch grew up in poverty in the highlands of Scotland and in 1851 emigrated to try his luck on the Victoria goldfields. Within a few years he was a successful shopkeeper and wine merchant on the Geelong goldfields. He acquired 35,000 acres (142 km2) on which he ran 50,000 head of sheep. It was Riddoch who planted the first grape vines and helped to diversify the pastoral economy of the area with an agricultural industry. In 1890, he established the Penola Fruit Growing Colony which was renamed Coonawarra in 1897.

Mary McKillop

Mary McKillop was a Roman Catholic nun, who beatified on 19 January 1995 at Randwick Racecourse, Sydney, in a Mass celebrated by Pope John Paul II; and became the first Australian to be named as a saint in 2010. In 1866 McKillop and Julian Tenison Woods established a Catholic school, St. Joseph's School, and developed the Woods/MacKillop Catholic education system in Australia, They also established in Penola a congregation of religious sisters, the Sisters of St Joseph of the Sacred Heart. Also known as the "Josephites" or "Brown Joeys", they continue to work with the poor and needy communities throughout the world today.

Railways
Penola was on the Mount Gambier to Wolseley railway line, which opened in 1887, until its closure to freight on 12 April 1995 and then to Limestone Coast Railway tourist passengers on 1 July 2006.

Heritage listings

Penola has a number of heritage-listed sites, including:

 31 Arthur Street: St Andrew's Presbyterian Church
 23 Arthur Street: Penola Public Library and Mechanics Institute
 Bowden Street: Ulva Cottage
 Church Street: National Bank Building
 28 Church Street: Bank of South Australia Building
 31 Church Street: Heyward's Royal Oak Hotel
 31 Church Street: Penola Post Office and Dwelling
 118 Church Street: Bushman's Inn
 Clarke Street: Penola railway station
 off Penola Road: John Shaw Neilson's Cottage
 Portland Street: Woods MacKillop Schoolhouse
 58 Riddoch Street: Penola Butter and Cheese Factory
 136 Wilson Street (Petticoat Lane): Sharam's First Cottage
 136 Wilson Street (Petticoat Lane): Sharam's Second Cottage

Climate

In 2010, a strong tornado ripped through the township destroying at least four buildings and damaging many more.

Tourism

The Mary MacKillop Interpretive Centre is located in Penola. It is in close proximity to the two State Heritage sites of Petticoat Lane and the original stone schoolhouse developed by Mary MacKillop in conjunction with Father Julian Tenison Woods in the 1800s.

Governance
Penola is located within the federal division of Barker, the state electoral district of MacKillop, and the local government area of the Wattle Range Council.

Sport

The town has an Australian Rules football team competing in the Kowree-Naracoorte-Tatiara Football League.

The Penola Racing Club holds thoroughbred horse racing at its track located near the town.

Media

The primary local newspaper of the district is The Pennant, published weekly since July 1946, while The Border Watch (also part of the Scott Group of Companies) and rival The Naracoorte Herald, also publish local and regional news.

Notable people

Penola has been home to some notable and interesting people. Among them Saint Mary MacKillop, poets John Shaw Neilson and Adam Lindsay Gordon, Father J.T. Woods, Scottish-Australian bush poet Will H. Ogilvie (1869–1963), Sara Douglass, Michael Graham (footballer) and John Riddoch.

It was The Border Watch that published Ogilvie's first poem in Australia on 22 April 1893, when he was at nearby Maaoupe Station.

The Antarctic explorer John Riddoch Rymill was born in Penola, named his ship Penola and later successfully farmed the Old Penola Estate.

References

Further reading

 Hanna, Cliff. Corartwalla: A History of Penola, the Land and Its People (Magill Publications, 2001); 382pp

External links
South Australian History
Wattle Range Council

Towns in South Australia
Limestone Coast